Paje is a village on the Tanzanian island of Unguja, part of Zanzibar. It is located on the southeast coast between the villages of Bwejuu and Jambiani.

The lagoon is used to learn kiteboarding, since a very consistent side-onshore wind is blowing most of the year, the lagoon is shallow during low tide and has a sandy bottom, and the reef protects the lagoon from waves.

References

Villages in Zanzibar